Gimpel may refer to:

 Gimpel (mountain) (2,173 m), a mountain in the Allgäu Alps
Gimpel (surname)
 "Gimpel the Fool", a short story by "Isaac Bashevis Singer"
 Gimpel Software, the creator of PC-lint
 Gimpel Fils, art gallery